A government-backed loan is a loan subsidized by the government, also known as a Federal Direct Loan, which protects lenders against defaults on payments, thus making it a lot easier for lenders to offer potential borrowers lower interest rates. Its primary aim is to make home ownership affordable to lower income households and first-time buyers.

There are numerous types of government-backed loans, which vary dependent on the country and status of the borrower. Arguably, the most widely known type of government-backed loan is the  US Federal Housing Administration FHA loan, in existence since 1934.

Other types of government-backed loans include the following:
 American Dream Downpayment Initiative - ADDI
 Good Neighbor Next Door
 HOPE VI
 Teacher Next Door Program
 VA loan
 State of New York Mortgage Agency – SONYMA

See also
 FHA insured loan

External links 
 Office of Housing

Loans
Government finances